Binabina or biabina is a type of plank boat from the Solomon Islands. It differs from the similar tomako and lisi in that only the stern is upturned, while the bow is horizontal.

See also 
 Tomako
 Lisi (boat)
 Waka taua
 Salisipan
 Kelulus

References

Austronesian ships